Gorky Park is the debut album by Russian hard rock band Gorky Park, released in 1989 by Mercury Records, after Jon Bon Jovi & Richie Sambora of Bon Jovi expressed interest in the band (and co-produced the album) and got them signed to Mercury, Bon Jovi's label.  It features the band's first hit single, "Bang", that has a mix of Russian and English lyrics and was put into rotation on MTV.

Track listing
All music composed by Gorky Park, except where noted.
Lyrics by Michael Berardi & Gregory Schwartz (1, 3, 8, 11), A.Grigoriev (2, 4), Jon Bon Jovi & Richie Sambora (5), Pete Townshend (6), J. Zocchi (7, 10), Karen Kavaleryan & Irina Antonian (9)
"Bang" – 4:47
"Try to Find Me" – 5:08
"Hit Me with the News" – 3:52
"Sometimes at Night" – 5:08
"Peace in Our Time" (Jon Bon Jovi, Richie Sambora) – 5:56
"My Generation" (Pete Townshend, includes Prokofiev's "Alexander Nevsky") – 4:44
"Within Your Eyes" – 4:55
"Child of the Wind" – 5:22
"Fortress" – 4:04
"Danger" – 3:30
"Action" – 3:55 (Bonus track on the CD and Cassette)

Personnel
Band members
 Alexei Belov: lead guitar, balalaika, all keyboards, background vocals
 Nikolai Noskov: lead vocals, background vocals
 Alexander Minkov: bass, background vocals
 Yan Yanenkov: lead guitar, acoustic guitar, background vocals
 Alexander Lvov: drums, percussion, background vocals

Additional musicians
Annette Hardeman, Gabriel Hardeman, Charlene Holloway, Paula Holloway: choir on "Try to Find Me"
Jon Bon Jovi: vocals on "Peace in Our Time"
Richie Sambora: electric guitar and background vocals on "Peace in Our Time"
Tico Torres: drums on "Peace in Our Time"

Charts

Album

Singles

Clips
 "Fortress" - the first video of the group, shot in Moscow in the autumn of 1988, the video combines staged scenes footage from the recording Studio and documentary Chronicles.
 "Bang" (1989) - staging clip, place of conduct surveys - New York.
 "My Generation" (1989) - clip combining staged scene, concert records and documentary historical Chronicles.
 "Peace In Our Time" (1990) - concert video.

Release history

European copies of the album were also imported to Australia.

Production
All songs arranged by Gorky Park.
Tracks 4, 6, 7, & 10 produced by Bruce Fairbairn.  Recorded & Mixed by Bruce Fairbairn & Mike Fraser, with recording assistance by Ken Lomas.
Track 5 produced by Jon Bon Jovi & Richie Sambora.  Recorded & Mixed by Obie O'Brien, with recording assistance by John "Joy Boy" Moyer & Nick "The Pig" DiDia.
All other tracks produced, recorded & mixed by Mitch Goldfarb & Gorky Park, with recording assistance by Brian Stover, Brooke Hendricks, and Mike Cohn.

References

1989 debut albums
Gorky Park (band) albums
Mercury Records albums
Albums produced by Bruce Fairbairn